Radostin Svetoslavov Stoychev (born September 25, 1969) is a former Bulgarian volleyball player and head coach.

Personal life
Radostin Stoychev was born in the Bulgarian capital Sofia into the family of volleyball coach Svetoslav Stoychev, whose achievements include a world championship title with the junior Bulgarian national team.

He owns a  restaurant chain and several laundries, and also holds a volleyball academy for children in Bulgaria together with Matey Kaziyski.

Career as player
As a player, Radostin Stoychev represented CSKA Sofia, Minyor Buhovo (with whom he won the national title) as well as teams from Portugal, Spain, Austria, Serbia and France (Tours VB). He played as a setter.

Career as coach
Stoychev's managerial career began at Slavia Sofia, whom he coached from 2003 to 2005, winning the Bulgarian Volleyball Cup in 2003. From 2005 to 2007, Stoychev was with VC Dynamo Moscow as their assistant manager. In Russia, he won the national championship in 2006 and the national cup in 2007.

In 2007, Stoychev was appointed the manager of Trento-based Italian Volleyball League team Trentino Volley. Stoychev attracted several of Bulgaria's top volleyball players to the club, such as Matey Kaziyski, Vladimir Nikolov, Smilen Mlyakov. In his debut 2007–08 season, he won the Italian national championship, an achievement comparable to the feats of Julio Velasco and Paulo Roberto de Freitas. In the following 2008–09 season, Trentino Volley's first season in the CEV Champions League, Stoychev led the club to the title in Europe's premier volleyball competition. The Bulgarian coach would  sit on the bench of Trentino Volley until 2013.
Stoychev in the season 2010-11 with Trentino won the FIVB Club World Championship, CEV Champions League and the Italian  Scudetto.
In 2011, Radostin Stoychev replaced Silvano Prandi and became head coach of the Bulgarian national team. He was released from his duties in May 2012, following a 1:3 loss against Germany during one of the qualification tournaments for the 2012 Summer Olympics. Nevertheless, Stoychev was reinstated as head coach a few days later following a heavily publicized media cross-fire between him, also supported by several of the team's star players, and the Bulgarian Volleyball Federation's Administration, which prompted the personal involvement of Boyko Borisov himself, the then Prime Minister of Bulgaria, in order to resolve the critical situation. Stoychev succeeded in qualifying the team for the 2012 London Olympics on his second attempt, but subsequently decided to step down due to a conflict of interest with the Bulgarian Volleyball Federation. Stoychev in three consecutive years named Best coach of the year in Bulgaria 2010, 2011 and 2012.

In the season 2012 he won the FIVB Club World Championship with Trentino club. In 2013 year he moved to Turkiah club Halkbank Ankara. He brought the Super league, SuperCup and cup champions. Stoychev returned to Italy in the next season, again  on the bench of Trentino Volley, winning the Italian Championship and losing the final of the  2015–16 CEV Champions League.

Achievements
 2005  Bulgarian Cup, with Slavia Sofia
 2006  Russian Cup, with VC Dynamo Moscow
 2006  Russian Championship - with VC Dynamo Moscow
 2009  CEV Champions League - with Itas Diatec Trentino
 2009  Italian Championship, with Itas Diatec Trentino
 2009  FIVB Club World Championship - with Itas Diatec Trentino
 2010  CEV Champions League - with Itas Diatec Trentino
 2010  Italian Cup Serie A, with Itas Diatec Trentino
 2010  Italian Championship, with Itas Diatec Trentino
 2010  FIVB Club World Championship - with Itas Diatec Trentino
 2011  CEV Champions League - with Itas Diates Trentino
 2011  Italian Championship, with Itas Diatec Trentino
 2011  FIVB Club World Championship - with Itas Diatec Trentino
 2012  CEV Champions League - with Itas Diatec Trentino
 2012  Italian Cup Serie A, with Itas Diatec Trentino
 2012  Italian Championship, with Itas Diatec Trentino
 2012  FIVB Club World Championship - with Itas Diatec Trentino
 2013  Italian Cup Serie A, with Itas Diatec Trentino
 2013  Italian Championship, with Itas Diatec Trentino
 2014  Turkish SuperCup 2013, with Halkbank Ankara
 2014  Turkish Cup, with Halkbank Ankara
 2014  Turkish Championship, with Halkbank Ankara
 2015  Italian Cup Serie A, with Trentino Volley
 2015  Italian Championship, with Trentino Volley
 2016  CEV Champions League - with Trentino Diatec

Individual awards
 2010 - Best coach of the year in Bulgaria 56.23%
 2011 - Costa-Aderlini Award for Best coach of the Serie A1
 2011 - Panchina D.o.c. Award the Triveneto
 2011 - Best coach of the year in Bulgaria 62.81%
 2012 - Best coach of the year in Bulgaria 49.49%
 2012 - Best coach of the year in Italy
 2015 - Costa-Aderlini Award for Best coach of the Serie A1

References

1969 births
Living people
Sportspeople from Sofia
Bulgarian men's volleyball players
Bulgarian volleyball coaches
Bulgarian expatriates in Portugal
Bulgarian expatriate sportspeople in Spain
Bulgarian expatriates in Russia
Bulgarian expatriate sportspeople in Turkey
Bulgarian expatriates in Italy